Baron Erik Magnus Staël von Holstein, (25 October 1749, Loddby, Sweden – 9 May 1802, Poligny, France) was a Swedish diplomat, soldier and courtier best known for being Sweden's Ambassador to France during the end of the Ancien Regime and the early years of the French Revolution, as well as being the husband of Madame de Staël. Erik Magnus assisted Gustav III during the Swedish Revolution of 1772 and was later named Chamberlain to Queen Sophia Magdalena. In 1783, he was appointed chargé d'affaires to the Court of France, and in 1785 he was named Ambassador. On 21 January 1786, he married the daughter of the French Minister of Finance, Jacques Necker, mademoiselle Anne Louise Germaine Necker, who was to achieve fame as "Madame de Staël".

Early life 

Erik Magnus was born on 25 October 1749 as the seventh child of Mathias Gustav Staël von Holstein, the scion of an ancient noble family originally from the Rhineland. As a young officer, Staël participated in the 1772 coup that brought Gustav III to power. For his services, he was made a knight of the Order of the Sword and chamberlain to the Queen. He was later assigned to the Swedish embassy to France, serving under the ambassador, Gustaf Philip Creutz. Staël's charming manners, good looks and affable disposition soon impressed Creutz and many members of the French court, including Queen Marie Antoinette herself.

Life and marriage 

After five years of negotiation between Staël, the King of Sweden, Marie Antoinette, and Jacques Necker, Staël agreed to marry Germaine. He obtained a dowry of 650,000 livres, was made permanent Swedish ambassador to the Court of Louis XVI, and was invested with the Order of the Polar Star. 

The marriage solved Staël’s financial problems (he was a prolific gambler) but was largely loveless, although not acrimonious. Baron and Madame de Staël pursued other love interests, and were often at odds over politics, but remained friendly to each other. Staël remained ambassador to France through the early convulsions of the French Revolution. Staël had a stormy relationship with Gustav III and he often found himself caught between the interests of his politically active and liberal wife, the ever-changing government of Republican France, and the counter-revolutionary position of the King of Sweden. Staël was dismissed as ambassador to France in 1795 by the young Gustav IV Adolf. For the remainder of his life, Staël ran up enormous debts due to his gambling and relied financially on the Neckers. 

In early 1802, Staël fell ill. His wife invited him back to the Necker family retreat at Coppet in the hopes that he would recover. In the late spring of 1802, Staël suffered a stroke on his way to Switzerland. Madame de Staël faithfully looked after him until he died, on the night of 8 May 1802. Though they were never really close, his death greatly affected his wife and she had him buried at Coppet. 

Staël was described by his wife and his contemporaries as a handsome man of polished manners, possessed of great wit and charm, kind-hearted, generous, and cultured with a great knowledge of history, fine wines and politics. He was a consummate and talented diplomat, who so greatly impressed the future-First Lady of the United States, Abigail Adams, who accompanied her husband John Adams, then US minister plenipotentiary to France, that she described him in letters home as: "The Baron de Staël, the Swedish ambassador, comes nearest to that character, in his manners and personal appearance, of any gentleman I ever saw. The first time I saw him I was prejudiced in his favor, for his countenance commands your good opinion; it is animated, intelligent, sensible, affable and, without being perfectly beautiful, is perfectly agreeable; add to this a fine figure and who can fail in being charmed with the Baron de Staël?" However, he could also be weak-willed and lacking in self-control. 

Staël successfully negotiated the cession of Saint Barthélemy to Sweden and supported the proposal of William Bolts for a Swedish colony in the eastern Indian Ocean. He skillfully navigated the troubled waters of the first years of the French Revolution. In his time, he was acknowledged as a diplomat of great talent, but ultimately he was destined to be overshadowed by the brilliance of his wife.

Children 
 Gustava Sofia Magdalena, born 1787, died in infancy.
 Gustava Hedvig, born 1789, died in infancy.
 Ludvig August, born on 1 September 1790. Died in France in 1827, therefore ending this line of the family. Married 1827 to Adèle Vernet. He was said to have been the biological son of the comte de Narbonne (1755-1813), himself the illegitimate son of King Louis XV.
 Mattias Albert, born on 2 October 1792. Ensign in the Cavalry. Killed in a duel on 12 July 1813 at Buchtenberg, in Mecklenburg.
 Hedvig Gustava Albertina, born 8 June 1797, died in Paris on 28 September 1838. Married on 20 February 1816 in Pisa to the French Foreign Minister, Victor de Broglie. Her biological father may have been Benjamin Constant.

References 

 Herman Lindqvist, Gustavs Dagar, 1998, 
 * 

First French Empire
Swedish nobility
People of the French Revolution
1749 births
1802 deaths
18th-century Swedish politicians
Ambassadors of Sweden to France
Swedish courtiers